Kitty Films (キティフィルム Kiti Firumu) was a production company established in 1972 in Japan.

History 
The company was first established in 1972 as Kitty Music Corporation under Hidenori Taga. It was a subsidiary of Polydor and MCA Inc., producing TV drama soundtracks. Their first was for the 1972 film Hajimete no Tabi.

By 1979 the company began to branch off into live action with the films Kagirinaku toumei ni chikai buru and Lady Oscar (adaptation of the manga The Rose of Versailles, Kitty had no association with the 1979 anime version of the latter, which was made by Tokyo Movie Shinsha). However, major success first came with their anime version of Rumiko Takahashi's Urusei Yatsura.

Starting in 1981, it marked Kitty's entry into anime production. Over the next two decades, Kitty Films would become noteworthy in and outside Japan as the producer of most of the animated versions of Takahashi's manga series, including Maison Ikkoku and Ranma ½. Takahashi had in fact attended the same college as Shigekazu Ochiai, the planner of most of Kitty's anime productions.

Despite their fame as producer, the actual animation of Kitty's works was handled by several independent anime studios, some of which still exist today. Studio Pierrot did the animation for the first half of Urusei Yatsura, Studio Deen animated the second half (except for several of the OVAs) and all of Maison Ikkoku and Ranma, while Madhouse handled the final Urusei Yatsura movie, some of the later Urusei Yatsura OVAs, Legend of the Galactic Heroes, and YAWARA! a fashionable judo girl!

Unfortunately, the company had suffered financial troubles from early on, which started to come to a head towards the end of the Ranma TV series in 1992. Hidenori Taga had in fact helped finance Kitty's film division by spending money from their music branch, and that year was forced to step down due to an unknown scandal, while Shigekazu Ochiai transferred to Pao House Studios (he died in 1999).

Kitty continued to produce less well-known shows such as Ping Pong Club (1995), but their output shrank to almost nothing by the end of the 20th century. Rumiko Takahashi did not work with Kitty again after the last Ranma OVA was released in 1996; Sunrise handled the animation duties on Inuyasha, and TMS animated Rumic Theater.

Kitty also had a subsidiary animation studio that produced a few anime series and OVAs. The studio's name was Kitty Film Mitaka Studio and never became as famous or successful as its parent. The studio was eventually disbanded.

Kitty Films was eventually reincorporated as Kitty Group and mainly exists as a talent agency, having sold off the rights to most of the Kitty Films library.

Productions 
10 Tokyo Warriors
The Adventures of T-Rex (1992 U.S./Japan coproduction with Gunther-Wahl Productions and C&D (Créativité et Développement); Hidenori Taga and Shigekazu Ochiai are credited as producers)
Creamy Mami, the Magic Angel
F
Hanaukyo Maid Team: La Verite 
Ike! Inachū Takkyūbu
Karuizawa Syndrome
Kiteretsu Daihyakka
Legend of the Galactic Heroes (rights transferred to K Factory)
Maison Ikkoku (sold to Pony Canyon, Blu-ray release sub-licensed to Warner Bros. Japan)
Megazone 23
Miyuki
Pastel Yumi, the Magic Idol
Radio City Fantasy
Ranma ½ (sold to Pony Canyon)
Sakura Diaries
Sena Keiko Obake Movies series
Sengoku Eiyū Densetsu Shinshaku: Sanada Jūyūshi the Animation
Sohryuden: Legend of the Dragon Kings
Super Zugan
The Enemy's the Pirates!
They Were 11
Tobira wo Akete
Tokyo Jusshōden
Touch
Twilight of the Cockroaches
Urusei Yatsura (sold to Pony Canyon, Blu-ray release sub-licensed Warner Bros. Japan)
YAWARA! a fashionable judo girl! (sold to VAP)
Kishin Douji Zenki (rights transferred to K Factory)
What's Michael (OVA's)
Zenki

External links
 Acres, Harley. "The Rise and Fall of Kitty Films", March 3, 2007. Rumic World.  Accessed 11 April 2007.

Mass media companies established in 1972
Mass media companies disestablished in 1996
Anime companies
Mass media companies of Japan
Japanese record labels
Universal Music Japan
Japanese companies established in 1972
Japanese companies disestablished in 1996